In probability and statistics, a moment measure is a mathematical quantity, function or, more precisely, measure  that is defined in relation to mathematical objects known as point processes, which are types of stochastic processes often used as mathematical models of physical phenomena representable as randomly positioned points in time, space or both. Moment measures generalize the idea of (raw) moments of random variables, hence arise often in the study of point processes and related fields.

An example of a moment measure is the first moment measure of a point process, often called mean measure or intensity measure, which gives the expected or average number of points of the point process being located in some region of space.  In other words, if the number of points of a point process located in some region of space is a random variable, then the first moment measure corresponds to the first moment of this random variable.

Moment measures feature prominently in the study of point processes as well as the related fields of stochastic geometry and spatial statistics whose applications are found in numerous scientific and engineering disciplines such as biology, geology, physics, and telecommunications.

Point process notation

Point processes are mathematical objects that are defined on some underlying mathematical space.

Point processes have a number of interpretations, which is reflected by the various types of point process notation.

 

and represents the point process being interpreted as a random set. Alternatively, the number of points of  located in some Borel set  is often written as:

 

which reflects a random measure interpretation for point processes. These two notations are often used in parallel or interchangeably.

Definitions

n-th power of a point process

For some integer , the -th power of a point process  is defined as:

The symbol   denotes standard multiplication.

The notation  reflects the interpretation of the point process  as a random measure.

The   -th power of a point process  can be equivalently defined as:

where  summation is performed over all -tuples of (possibly repeating) points, and   denotes an indicator function such that is a Dirac measure. This definition can be contrasted with the definition of the n-factorial power of a point process for which each n-tuples consists of n distinct points.

n-th moment measure

The -th moment measure is defined as:

where the E denotes the expectation (operator) of the point process . In other words, the n-th moment measure is the expectation of the n-th power of some point process.

The th moment measure of a point process  is equivalently defined as:

First moment measure

For some Borel set B, the first moment of a point process N is:

where  is known, among other terms, as the intensity measure or mean measure, and is interpreted as the expected or average number of points of  found or located in the set .

Second moment measure

which for a single Borel set  becomes

where  denotes the variance of the random variable .

The previous variance term alludes to how moments measures, like moments of random variables, can be used to calculate quantities like the variance of point processes.

Example: Poisson point process

For a general Poisson point process with intensity measure  the first moment measure is:

which for a homogeneous Poisson point process with constant intensity  means:

For the Poisson case with measure  the second moment measure defined on the product set  is:

which in the homogeneous case reduces to

See also

 Factorial moment
 Factorial moment measure
 Moment

References

Point processes
Spatial analysis
Moment (mathematics)